The Children's Museum is the oldest museum for children in Connecticut, United States.  The museum was founded in 1927 as the Children's Museum of Hartford, and was known until 2006 as The Science Center of Connecticut. The Museum is geared towards young children, ages 2–8. It is the fifth oldest of all Children's Museums in the US, serves over 200,000 people each year.  

Formally located at 950 Trout Brook Dr. in West Hartford, museum operations temporarily moved to 180 Mohegan Drive in West Hartford in 2022. The Children's Museum offers interactive exhibits, over a hundred live animals, and science and nature classes for children. It also includes The Children's Museum Preschool, one of the nation's oldest preschools, and of very few that feature a science and nature curriculum. The former museum featured New England's second largest planetarium, which closed in 2022, and a life-sized replica of a sperm whale (Connecticut's State animal) that visitors can walk inside. Conny the whale still resides on Trout Brook Drive in West Hartford.

External links 
 The Children's Museum

Museums established in 1927
Children's museums in Connecticut
Museums in Hartford County, Connecticut
Planetaria in the United States
Buildings and structures in West Hartford, Connecticut